Sara Goodman (born 22 October 1999) is a Canadian field hockey player.

Personal life
Sara Goodman was born and raised in Duncan, British Columbia.

Career

Under–21
Goodman made her debut for the Canadian U–21 team in 2016, at the Pan American Junior Championship in Tacarigua.

She represented the team three years later in a four–nations tournament in Dublin.

In 2021, she captained the team to a gold medal at her second Pan American Junior Championship.

National team
Sara Goodman debuted for the national team in 2018 during a test series against Chile in Santiago.

She won her first medal in 2022, taking home bronze at the Pan American Cup in Santiago.

References

External links

Sara Goodman at Field Hockey Canada

1999 births
Living people
Canadian female field hockey players
Female field hockey defenders
Sportspeople from British Columbia
People from Duncan, British Columbia